Herman is a masculine given name, from an ancient Germanic name consisting of the elements harja- "army" and mann- "man". Hermine is the feminine form of Herman.
It is first recorded in the 8th century, in the forms Hariman, Heriman, Hairman, Herman.

It regained popularity in the English-speaking world in the 19th century, particularly in the United States amongst German Americans.

Herman remains widely used in Dutch. Variant forms include German Hermann, French Armand, Italian and Iberian Armando, Italian Ermanno.

Herman has also been in use as a German surname since the 16th century.

The name of Arminius, the 1st-century leader of the Cherusci, became identified with the name Hermann in German historiography in the early modern period; thus, Arminius is traditionally known as Hermann der Cheruskerfürst in German. The name of Arminius is in fact from a stem ermen- "strong". Conflation of this element with the name Herman may indeed date to the medieval period, via variant forms such as Ermin, Ermen, Erman, Ermanno, feminine Ermina, Ermana, Hirmina, Hermena.

Middle Ages
 Herman I (archbishop of Cologne) (d. 924)
 Herman I, Duke of Swabia (d. 949)
 Hermann Billung Duke of Saxony (d. 973)
 Herman II, Duke of Swabia (d. 1003)
 Herman III, Duke of Swabia (d. 1012)
 Herman IV, Duke of Swabia (d. 1038)
 Herman II (archbishop of Cologne) (d. 1056)
 Hermann of Reichenau (1013–1064)
 Herman (bishop of Salisbury), bishop of Ramsbury, Sherborne and Salisbury (d. 1078)
 Hermann of Salm (d. 1088)
 Herman the Archdeacon, hagiographer, d. 1090s
 Herman II, Margrave of Baden (d. 1130)
 Herman van Horne (d. 1156), bishop of Utrecht
 Herman of Carinthia (ca. 1100–ca. 1160), Benedictine scholar
 Herman Joseph of Cologne (1150–1243)
 Hermannus Alemannus, Herman the German, 13th-century translator
 Hermann von Münster (d. 1392), master glassmaker
 Hermann II, Count of Celje (1365–1435)
 Herman of Valaam, saint of the Russian Orthodox Church and founder of the Valaam Monastery in Karelia (date unknown, 10th to 15th centuries)

Early Modern
 Hermann of Wied, archbishop of Cologne (1477–1552)
 Herman de Lynden (1547–1603), Belgian military commander in the Eighty Years' War
 Catharina Herman (died after 1604), Dutch war heroine
 Jobst Herman, Count of Lippe (1625–1678), German noble
 Herman Boerhaave (1668–1738), Dutch botanist
 Herman of Alaska (1756–1837), Russian missionary to Alaska

Modern
The name Herman was popular in the United States during the late nineteenth and early twentieth century, consistently ranking between 55 and 44 throughout the 1880–1914 period. Beginning with World War I, the name's popularity entered a steady decline for the remainder of the twentieth century, falling below rank 1,000 in the year 2000.

 Herman (Aav), (1878–1961), head of the Orthodox Church of Finland
 Herman (Swaiko) (born 1931), former head of the Orthodox Church in America
 Herman M. Albert (1901–1947), American lawyer and politician
 Herman D. Aldrich (1801–1880), American businessman
 Herman Barron (1909–1978), American professional golfer
 Herman Berendsen (1934–2019), Dutch chemist
 Herman Berlinski (1910–2001), German-born American composer and conductor
 Herman Bouma (born 1934), Dutch vision researcher and gerontechnologist
 Herman Cain (1945–2020), American businessman, talk show host, and candidate for the 2012 Republican presidential nomination
 Herman Dreer (1888–1981), American academic administrator, educational reformer and activist, author, editor, minister, and civil rights leader
 Herman Edwards (born 1954), known as Herm Edwards, American football player and coach
 Herman Becker Fast (1887-1938), American businessman, farmer, politician
 Herman Goldstein (1939–2020), American criminologist
 Herman Goldstine (1913–2004), American mathematician and computer scientist
 Herman W. Hellman (1843–1906), German-born American Jewish businessman
 Herman Johannes (1912–1992), Indonesian professor, scientist and politician
 Herman José (born 1954), Portuguese showman, singer and comedian
 Herman Leenders (born 1960), Flemish writer and poet
 Herman Li (李康敏 Lǐ Kāng Mǐn, born 1976), Chinese musician
 Herman Lieberman (1870–1941), Polish lawyer and politician
 Herman Long (disambiguation), multiple people
 Herman Francis Mark (1895–1992), Austrian-American chemist
 Herman J. Mankiewicz (1897–1953), American screenwriter
 Herman Melville (1819–1891), American novelist
 Herman A. Metz (1867–1934), German-born -American U.S. Representative from New York and New York City Comptroller and businessman
 Herman Miller (Wisconsin politician) (1833–1922), American politician
 Herman Miller (writer) (1919–1999), American screenwriter and film producer
 Herman Redemeijer (1930–2020), Dutch politician
 Herman Salmon (1913–1980), American barnstormer, air racer, and test pilot
 Herman Leonard de Silva (1928–2009), Permanent Representative of Sri Lanka to the United Nations
 Herman Stump (1837–1917), American politician
 Herman Suselbeek (born 1943), Dutch rower
 Herman Terrado (born 1989), Guam-born American mixed martial artist
 Herman van Bekkum (born 1932), Dutch chemist
 Herman Van der Wee (born 1928), Belgian economic historian
 Herman van Praag (born 1929), Dutch psychiatrist
 Herman Claudius van Riemsdijk (born 1948), Brazilian chess player
 Herman Van Rompuy (born 1947), Belgian politician, first President of the European Council
 Herman Van Springel (born 1943), Belgian cyclist
 Herman van Veen (born 1945), Dutch stage performer, actor, musician, singer/songwriter and author
 Herman Vedel (1875–1948), Danish painter
 Herman Wirth (1885–1981), Dutch-German lay historian and scholar
 Herman Wouk (1915–2019), American author
 Herman Zetterberg (1904–1963), Swedish jurist and politician

 Stage name
 Peter Noone (born 1947), English singer-songwriter and actor, stage name Herman as leader of the pop group Herman's Hermits

Fictional characters
 Herman, a bug in the Disney segment Mickey and the Beanstalk
 Herman Hermann, a one-armed character from the American television sitcom The Simpsons
 Herman Munster, from American television sitcom The Munsters
 Herman Melleville, a monster from Doug's 1st Movie
 Herman I Vermin, a character created by American cartoonist Marc Hempel
 Herman Toothrot, from LucasArts' Monkey Island
 Herman Brooks, the titular character of the American television sitcom Herman's Head
 Colonel Herman Dietrich, from Indiana Jones and the Raiders of the Lost Ark
 Herman the mouse, created by American animation studio Famous Studios (a.k.a. Paramount Cartoon Studios)
 Herman Schultz aka Shocker, from Marvel Comics
Herman Carter/The Doctor, from the horror game Dead by Daylight

As a surname
Variants include Herrmann, Herrman, Herman, Hermann, Hermanns

Disambiguation lists 
Edward Herman (disambiguation)
 Robert Herman (disambiguation)
 Tom Herman (disambiguation)

Early modern 
 Nikolaus Herman (c.1500–1561), German cantor and hymn writer
 Augustine Herman (1621–1686), Bohemian explorer of North America
 Jakob Hermann (1678–1733), Swiss mathematician

Modern 
 Arthur L. Herman (born 1956), American historian
 Babe Herman (1903–1987), Major League Baseball right fielder
 Billy Herman (1909–1992), Major League Baseball second baseman
 David Herman (born 1967), American actor
 Elisabeth Hermans, Belgian soprano
 Faithe Herman, American actress
 Hanna Herman (born 1959), Ukrainian state and political activist
 Henry Herman, pen name of Henry Heydrac D'Arco (1832–1894), English dramatist and novelist
 Jerry Herman (1931–2019), American composer
 Josef Herman (1911–2000), Polish-British painter
 Louis Herman (1930–2016), American marine biologist
 M. Justin Herman (1909–1971), American public administrator; Executive Director of the San Francisco Redevelopment Agency
 Oskar Herman (1886–1974), Croatian painter
 Robin Herman (1951-2022), American sports journalist
 Róża Herman (1902–1995), Polish chess master
 Vilim Herman (born 1949), Croatian university professor, politician and former representative in the Croatian Parliament
 Woody Herman (1913–1987), American jazz clarinetist and big band leader
 Yaron Herman (born 1981), Israeli jazz pianist

Fictional characters
 Pee-wee Herman, played by Paul Reubens
 Gunther Hermann, from the computer game Deus Ex

See also
 Herman (disambiguation)
 Hermann (name)
 Herm (given name)
 Hermans
Harman (surname)
 Arman (name)
 Armand (name)
Armin (name)
 Germain (disambiguation)
 Germán
 German (name)
 Germanus (disambiguation)

References

Jewish surnames
Masculine given names
English masculine given names
German masculine given names
Dutch masculine given names
Norwegian masculine given names
Swedish masculine given names
Finnish masculine given names
Icelandic masculine given names
Danish masculine given names